Out All Night is an American sitcom that aired on NBC from September 19, 1992 to July 9, 1993 for one season. The series stars Patti LaBelle, and was created by Andy Borowitz, Susan Borowitz, and Rob Edwards.

Cast
Patti LaBelle — Chelsea Paige
Morris Chestnut — Jeff Carswell
Vivica A. Fox — Charisse Chamberlain
Duane Martin — Vidal Thomas
Simon O'Brien — Angus McEwen

Episodes

References
 
 Braxton, Greg. "Television: Where More Isn’t Much Better: African- Americans are increasingly welcome in prime time, but some observers say the new shows fail to rise above stereotypes." The Los Angeles Times, 4 Oct. 1992, www.latimes.com/archives/la-xpm-1992-10-04-ca-1112-story.html.
 Lowry, Brian. "Curtain comes down on NBC’s ‘Out All Night’." Variety, 23 Feb. 1993, variety.com/1993/tv/news/curtain-comes-down-on-nbc-s-out-all-night-104265/.
 Patti Labelle stars as woman with money and power on TV’s “Out All Night.” (Cover Story). (1992). Jet, (25), 56. Retrieved from https://books.google.com/books?id=vcEDAAAAMBAJ&pg=PA56&lpg=PA56&dq=out+all+night+patti+labelle&source=bl&ots=gN8AO9yt_m&sig=ACfU3U25crgak1MU-i6RuOj1XsssHLl1gA&hl=en&sa=X&ved=2ahUKEwiRw-qA7ffhAhXDg-AKHaGmA-Y4ChDoATAMegQICRAB#v=onepage&q=out%20all%20night%20patti%20labelle&f=false
 "TV Listings for - January 7, 1993." TV Tango, Jan. 1993, www.tvtango.com/listings?filters%5Bdate%5D%5Bmonth%5D=1&filters%5Bdate%5D%5Bday%5D=7&filters%5Bdate%5D%5Byear%5D=1993&commit.x=27&commit.y=3.
 "TVListings: Past and Present." TV Tango, 19 Sept. 1992, doi:http://www.tvtango.com/listings?filters%5Bdate%5D%5Bmonth%5D=9&filters%5Bdate%5D%5Bday%5D=19&filters%5Bdate%5D%5Byear%5D=1992&commit.x=19&commit.y=17

External links

1990s American black sitcoms
1990s American sitcoms
1992 American television series debuts
1993 American television series endings
English-language television shows
NBC original programming
Television shows set in Los Angeles
Television series by Universal Television
Television series created by Andy Borowitz
Television series created by Susan Borowitz